The Medal of the Crown of King Zvonimir was founded as a "visible sign of decoration for merits done, in peace or in war, for Croatian people and Independent State of Croatia."

The Medal of the Crown of King Zvonimir had three grades: silver, bronze and iron. The medal was created by Croatian sculptor Ivo Kerdić.

It was named for King Demetrius Zvonimir, a Croatian king.

Sources
 Hrvatska odlikovanja (mr. sc. Stjepan Adanić, general-bojnik Krešimir Kašpar, prof. Boris Prister, prof. Ivan Ružić)

Recipients 
 Kurt Waldheim

See also
Crown of Zvonimir

Orders, decorations, and medals of the Independent State of Croatia
Awards established in 1941
1941 establishments in Croatia